Melentyevsky is a rural locality (a settlement) in Konoshsky District, Arkhangelsk Oblast, Russia. The population was 418 as of 2010. There are 11 streets.

Geography 
Melentyevsky is located on the Konosha River, 35 km north of Konosha (the district's administrative centre) by road. Ovrazhnoye is the nearest rural locality.

References 

Rural localities in Konoshsky District